

Events

Pre-1600
1054 – Siward, Earl of Northumbria, invades Scotland and defeats Macbeth, King of Scotland, somewhere north of the Firth of Forth.
1189 – Friedrich Barbarossa arrives at Niš, the capital of Serbian King Stefan Nemanja, during the Third Crusade.
1202 – Georgian–Seljuk wars: At the Battle of Basian the Kingdom of Georgia defeats the Sultanate of Rum.
1214 – Battle of Bouvines: Philip II of France decisively defeats Imperial, English and Flemish armies, effectively ending John of England's Angevin Empire.
1299 – According to Edward Gibbon, Osman I invades the territory of Nicomedia for the first time, usually considered to be the founding day of the Ottoman state.
1302 – Battle of Bapheus: Decisive Ottoman victory over the Byzantines opening up Bithynia for Turkish conquest.
1549 – The Jesuit priest Francis Xavier's ship reaches Japan.

1601–1900
1663 – The English Parliament passes the second Navigation Act requiring that all goods bound for the American colonies have to be sent in English ships from English ports. After the Acts of Union 1707, Scotland would be included in the Act.
1689 – Glorious Revolution: The Battle of Killiecrankie is a victory for the Jacobites.
1694 – A Royal charter is granted to the Bank of England.
1714 – The Great Northern War: The first significant victory of the Russian Navy in the naval battle of Gangut against the Swedish Navy near the Hanko Peninsula.
1775 – Founding of the U.S. Army Medical Department:  The Second Continental Congress passes legislation establishing "an hospital for an army consisting of 20,000 men."  
1778 – American Revolution: First Battle of Ushant: British and French fleets fight to a standoff.
1789 – The first U.S. federal government agency, the Department of Foreign Affairs, is established (it will be later renamed Department of State).
1794 – French Revolution: Maximilien Robespierre is arrested after encouraging the execution of more than 17,000 "enemies of the Revolution".
1816 – Seminole Wars: The Battle of Negro Fort ends when a hot shot cannonball fired by US Navy Gunboat No. 154 explodes the fort's Powder Magazine, killing approximately 275. It is considered the deadliest single cannon shot in US history.
1857 – Indian Rebellion: Sixty-eight men hold out for eight days against a force of 2,500 to 3,000 mutinying sepoys and 8,000 irregular forces.
1865 – Welsh settlers arrive at Chubut in Argentina.
1866 – The first permanent transatlantic telegraph cable is successfully completed, stretching from Valentia Island, Ireland, to Heart's Content, Newfoundland.
1880 – Second Anglo-Afghan War: Battle of Maiwand: Afghan forces led by Mohammad Ayub Khan defeat the British Army in battle near Maiwand, Afghanistan.
1890 – Vincent van Gogh shoots himself and dies two days later.
1900 – Kaiser Wilhelm II makes a speech comparing Germans to Huns; for years afterwards, "Hun" would be a disparaging name for Germans.

1901–present
1917 – World War I: The Allies reach the Yser Canal at the Battle of Passchendaele.
1919 – The Chicago Race Riot erupts after a racial incident occurred on a South Side beach, leading to 38 fatalities and 537 injuries over a five-day period.
1921 – Researchers at the University of Toronto, led by biochemist Frederick Banting, prove that the hormone insulin regulates blood sugar.
1929 – The Geneva Convention of 1929, dealing with treatment of prisoners-of-war, is signed by 53 nations.
1940 – The animated short A Wild Hare is released, introducing the character of Bugs Bunny.
1942 – World War II: Allied forces successfully halt the final Axis advance into Egypt.
1947 – In Vatican City, Rome, canonization of Catherine Labouré, the saint whose apparitions of the Virgin Mary originated the worldwide diffusion of the Miraculous Medal.
1949 – Initial flight of the de Havilland Comet, the first jet-powered airliner.
1953 – Cessation of hostilities is achieved in the Korean War when the United States, China, and North Korea sign an armistice agreement. Syngman Rhee, President of South Korea, refuses to sign but pledges to observe the armistice.
1955 – The Austrian State Treaty restores Austrian sovereignty.
  1955   – El Al Flight 402 is shot down by two fighter jets after straying into Bulgarian air space. All 58 people on board are killed.
1959 – The Continental League is announced as baseball's "third major league" in the United States.
1963 – The Puijo observation tower is opened to the general public at Puijo Hill in Kuopio, Finland.
1964 – Vietnam War: Five thousand more American military advisers are sent to South Vietnam bringing the total number of United States forces in Vietnam to 21,000.
1974 – Watergate scandal: The House of Representatives Judiciary Committee votes 27 to 11 to recommend the first article of impeachment (for obstruction of justice) against President Richard Nixon.
1975 – Mayor of Jaffna and former MP Alfred Duraiappah is shot dead.
1981 – While landing at Chihuahua International Airport, Aeromexico Flight 230 overshoots the runway. Thirty-two of the 66 passengers and crew on board the DC-9 are killed.
1983 – Black July: Eighteen Tamil political prisoners at the Welikada high security prison in Colombo are massacred by Sinhalese prisoners, the second such massacre in two days.
1989 – While attempting to land at Tripoli International Airport in Libya, Korean Air Flight 803 crashes just short of the runway. Seventy-five of the 199 passengers and crew and four people on the ground are killed, in the second accident involving a DC-10 in less than two weeks, the first being United Airlines Flight 232.
1990 – The Supreme Soviet of the Belarusian Soviet Republic declares independence of Belarus from the Soviet Union. Until 1996 the day is celebrated as the Independence Day of Belarus; after a referendum held that year the celebration of independence is moved to June 3.
  1990   – The Jamaat al Muslimeen attempt a coup d'état in Trinidad and Tobago.
1995 – The Korean War Veterans Memorial is dedicated in Washington, D.C.
1996 – In Atlanta, United States, a pipe bomb explodes at Centennial Olympic Park during the 1996 Summer Olympics.
1997 – About 50 people are killed in the Si Zerrouk massacre in Algeria.
2002 – Ukraine airshow disaster: A Sukhoi Su-27 fighter crashes during an air show at Lviv, Ukraine killing 77 and injuring more than 500 others, making it the deadliest air show disaster in history.
2005 – After an incident during STS-114, NASA grounds the Space Shuttle, pending an investigation of the continuing problem with the shedding of foam insulation from the external fuel tank.
2015 – At least seven people are killed and many injured after gunmen attack an Indian police station in Punjab.

Births

Pre-1600
 774 – Kūkai, Japanese Buddhist monk, founder of Esoteric (Shingon) Buddhism (d. 835)
1452 – Ludovico Sforza, Italian son of Francesco I Sforza (d. 1508)
  1452   – Lucrezia Crivelli, mistress of Ludovico Sforza (d. 1508)
1502 – Francesco Corteccia, Italian composer (d. 1571)
1578 – Frances Howard, Duchess of Richmond (d. 1639)

1601–1900
1612 – Murad IV, Ottoman Sultan (d. 1640)
1625 – Edward Montagu, 1st Earl of Sandwich (d. 1672)
1667 – Johann Bernoulli, Swiss mathematician and academic (d. 1748)
1733 – Jeremiah Dixon, English surveyor and astronomer (d. 1779)
1740 – Jeanne Baré, French explorer (d. 1803)
1741 – François-Hippolyte Barthélémon, French-English violinist and composer (d. 1808)
1752 – Samuel Smith, American general and politician (d. 1839)
1768 – Charlotte Corday, French assassin of Jean-Paul Marat (d. 1793)
  1768   – Joseph Anton Koch, Austrian painter (d. 1839)
1773 – Jacob Aall, Norwegian economist and politician (d. 1844)
1777 – Thomas Campbell, Scottish-French poet and academic (d. 1844)
  1777   – Henry Trevor, 21st Baron Dacre, English general (d. 1853)
1781 – Mauro Giuliani, Italian singer-songwriter and guitarist (d. 1828)
1784 – Denis Davydov, Russian general and poet (d. 1839)
1812 – Thomas Lanier Clingman, American general and politician (d. 1897)
1818 – Agostino Roscelli, Italian priest and saint (d. 1902)
1824 – Alexandre Dumas, fils, French novelist and playwright (d. 1895)
1833 – Thomas George Bonney, English geologist, mountaineer, and academic (d. 1923)
1834 – Miguel Grau Seminario, Peruvian admiral (d. 1879)
1835 – Giosuè Carducci, Italian poet and educator, Nobel Prize laureate (d. 1907)
1848 – Loránd Eötvös, Hungarian physicist and politician, Minister of Education of Hungary (d. 1919)
  1848   – Friedrich Ernst Dorn, German physicist (d.1916)
1853 – Vladimir Korolenko, Ukrainian journalist, author, and activist (d. 1921)
  1853   – Elizabeth Plankinton, American philanthropist (d. 1923)
1854 – Takahashi Korekiyo, Japanese accountant and politician, 20th Prime Minister of Japan (d. 1936)
1857 – José Celso Barbosa, Puerto Rican physician, sociologist, and politician (d. 1921)
  1857   – Ernest Alfred Thompson Wallis Budge, English Egyptologist, Orientalist, and philologist (d.1934)
1858 – George Lyon, Canadian golfer and cricketer (d. 1938)
1866 – António José de Almeida, Portuguese physician and politician, 6th President of Portugal (d. 1929)
1867 – Enrique Granados, Spanish pianist and composer (d. 1916)
1870 – Hilaire Belloc, French-born British writer and historian (d. 1953)
1872 – Stanislav Binički, Serbian composer, conductor, and pedagogue. (d. 1942)
1879 – Francesco Gaeta, Italian poet (d. 1927)
1877 – Ernő Dohnányi, Hungarian pianist, composer, and conductor (d. 1960)
1881 – Hans Fischer, German chemist and academic, Nobel Prize laureate (d. 1945)
1882 – Geoffrey de Havilland, English pilot and engineer, founded the de Havilland Aircraft Company (d. 1965)
1886 – Ernst May, German architect and urban planner (d. 1970)
1889 – Vera Karalli, Russian ballerina, choreographer, and actress (d. 1972)
1890 – Benjamin Miessner, American radio engineer and inventor (d. 1976)
1890 – Armas Taipale, Finnish discus thrower and shot putter (d. 1976)
1891 – Jacob van der Hoeden, Dutch-Israeli veterinarian and academic (d. 1968)
1893 – Ugo Agostoni, Italian cyclist (d. 1941)
1894 – Mientje Kling, Dutch actress (d. 1966)
1896 – Robert George, Scottish air marshal and politician, 24th Governor of South Australia (d. 1967)
  1896   – Henri Longchambon, French lawyer and politician (d. 1969)
1899 – Percy Hornibrook, Australian cricketer (d. 1976)

1901–present
1902 – Yaroslav Halan, Ukrainian playwright and publicist (d. 1949)
1903 – Nikolay Cherkasov, Russian actor (d. 1966)
  1903   – Michail Stasinopoulos, Greek jurist and politician, President of Greece (d. 2002)
  1903   – Mārtiņš Zīverts, Latvian playwright (d. 1990)
1904 – Lyudmila Rudenko, Soviet chess player (d. 1986)
1905 – Leo Durocher, American baseball player and manager (d. 1991)
1906 – Jerzy Giedroyc, Polish author and activist (d. 2000)
  1906   – Herbert Jasper, Canadian psychologist and neurologist (d. 1999)
1907 – Ross Alexander, American stage and film actor (d. 1937)
  1907   – Carl McClellan Hill, American educator and academic administrator (d. 1995)
  1907   – Irene Fischer, Austrian-American geodesist and mathematician (d. 2009)
1908 – Joseph Mitchell, American journalist and author (d. 1996)
1910 – Julien Gracq, French author and critic (d. 2007)
  1910   – Lupita Tovar, Mexican-American actress (d. 2016)
1911 – Rayner Heppenstall, English author and poet (d. 1981)
1912 – Vernon Elliott, English bassoon player, composer, and conductor (d. 1996)
1913 – George L. Street III, American captain, Medal of Honor recipient (d. 2000)
1914 – August Sang, Estonian poet and translator (d. 1969)
1915 – Mario Del Monaco, Italian tenor (d. 1982)
  1915   – Josef Priller, German colonel and pilot (d. 1961)
1916 – Elizabeth Hardwick, American literary critic, novelist, and short story  writer (d. 2007)
  1916   – Skippy Williams, American saxophonist and arranger (d. 1994)
  1916   – Keenan Wynn, American actor (d. 1986)
1918 – Leonard Rose, American cellist and educator (d. 1984)
1920 – Henry D. "Homer" Haynes, American comedian and musician (d. 1971) 
1921 – Garry Davis, American pilot and activist, created the World Passport (d. 2013)
  1921   – Émile Genest, Canadian-American actor (d. 2003)
1922 – Adolfo Celi, Italian actor, director, and screenwriter (d. 1986)
  1922   – Norman Lear, American screenwriter and producer
1923 – Mas Oyama, South Korean-Japanese martial artist (d. 1994)
1924 – Vincent Canby, American historian and critic (d. 2000)
  1924   – Otar Taktakishvili, Georgian composer and conductor (d. 1989)
1927 – Guy Carawan, American singer and musicologist (d. 2015)
  1927   – Pierre Granier-Deferre, French director and screenwriter (d. 2007)
  1927   – Will Jordan, American comedian and actor (d. 2018)
  1927   – C. Rajadurai, Sri Lankan journalist and politician, 1st Mayor of Batticaloa
  1927   – John Seigenthaler, American journalist and academic (d. 2014)
1928 – Joseph Kittinger, American colonel and pilot (d. 2022)
1929 – Jean Baudrillard, French sociologist and philosopher (d. 2007)
  1929   – Harvey Fuqua, American singer-songwriter and producer (d. 2010)
  1929   – Jack Higgins, English author and academic (d. 2022)
  1929   – Marc Wilkinson, French-Australian composer and conductor (d. 2022)
1930 – Joy Whitby, English director, producer, and screenwriter
  1930   – Shirley Williams, English academic and politician, Secretary of State for Education (d. 2021)
1931 – Khieu Samphan, Cambodian academic and politician, 28th Prime Minister of Cambodia
  1931   – Jerry Van Dyke, American actor (d. 2018)
1932 – Forest Able, American basketball player
  1932   – Diane Webber, American model, dancer and actress (d. 2008)
1933 – Nick Reynolds, American singer and bongo player (d. 2008)
  1933   – Ted Whitten, Australian football player and journalist (d. 1995)
1935 – Hillar Kärner, Estonian chess player (d. 2017)
  1935   – Billy McCullough, Northern Irish footballer
1936 – J. Robert Hooper, American businessman and politician (d. 2008)
1937 – Anna Dawson,  English actress and singer
  1937   – Don Galloway, American actor (d. 2009)
  1937   – Robert Holmes à Court, South African-Australian businessman and lawyer (d. 1990)
1938 – Gary Gygax, American game designer, co-created Dungeons & Dragons (d. 2008)
1939 – William Eggleston, American photographer and academic
  1939   – Michael Longley, Northern Irish poet and academic
  1939   – Paulo Silvino, Brazilian comedian, composer and actor (d. 2017)
1940 – Pina Bausch, German dancer and choreographer (d. 2009)
1941 – Christian Boesch, Austrian opera singer
  1941   – Johannes Fritsch, German viola player and composer (d. 2010)
1942 – Édith Butler, Canadian singer-songwriter
  1942   – Bobbie Gentry, American singer-songwriter and guitarist
  1942   – John Pleshette, American actor, director, and screenwriter
  1942   – Dennis Ralston, American tennis player (d. 2020)
1943 – Jeremy Greenstock, English diplomat, British Ambassador to the United Nations
1944 – Jean-Marie Leblanc, French cyclist and journalist
  1944   – Barbara Thomson, English saxophonist and composer (d. 2022) 
1946 – Peter Reading, English poet and author (d. 2011)
1947 – Kazuyoshi Miura, Japanese businessman (d. 2008)
  1947   – Giora Spiegel, Israeli footballer and coach
  1947   – Betty Thomas, American actress, director, and producer
1948 – Peggy Fleming, American figure skater and sportscaster
  1948   – James Munby, English lawyer and judge
  1948   – Henny Vrienten, Dutch singer-songwriter and bass player 
1949 – Maury Chaykin, American-Canadian actor (d. 2010)
  1949   – André Dupont, Canadian ice hockey player and coach
  1949   – Rory MacDonald, Scottish singer-songwriter and bass player 
  1949   – Maureen McGovern, American singer and actress
  1949   – Robert Rankin, English author and illustrator
1950 – Simon Jones, English actor
1951 – Roseanna Cunningham, Scottish lawyer and politician, Minister for Community Safety and Legal Affairs
  1951   – Bob Diamond, American-English banker and businessman
  1951   – Rolf Thung, Dutch tennis player
1952 – Marvin Barnes, American basketball player (d. 2014)
  1952   – Roxanne Hart, American actress
1953 – Chung Dong-young, South Korean journalist and politician, 31st South Korean Minister of Unification
  1953   – Yahoo Serious, Australian actor, director, producer, and screenwriter
1954 – Philippe Alliot, French race car driver and sportscaster
  1954   – G. S. Bali, Indian lawyer and politician
  1954   – Mark Stanway, English keyboard player
  1954   – Ricardo Uceda, Peruvian journalist and author
1955 – Cat Bauer, American journalist, author, and playwright
  1955   – Allan Border, Australian cricketer and coach
  1955   – John Howell, English journalist and politician
  1955   – Bobby Rondinelli, American drummer 
1956 – Carol Leifer, American actress, comedian, screenwriter, and producer
1957 – Bill Engvall, American comedian, actor, and producer
1958 – Christopher Dean, English figure skater and choreographer
  1958   – Kimmo Hakola, Finnish composer
1959 – Joe DeSa, American baseball player (d. 1986)
  1959   – Hugh Green, American football player
  1959   – Yiannos Papantoniou, French-Greek economist and politician, Greek Minister of National Defence
1960 – Jo Durie, English tennis player and sportscaster
  1960   – Conway Savage, Australian singer-songwriter and keyboard player (d. 2018)
  1960   – Emily Thornberry, English lawyer and politician
1961 – Ed Orgeron, American football coach
1962 – Neil Brooks, Australian swimmer
  1962   – Karl Mueller, American bass player (d. 2005)
1963 – Donnie Yen, Chinese-Hong Kong actor, director, producer, and martial artist
1964 – Rex Brown, American bass player and songwriter 
1965 – José Luis Chilavert, Paraguayan footballer
1966 – Steve Tilson, English footballer and manager
1967 – Rahul Bose, Indian journalist, actor, director, and screenwriter
  1967   – Juliana Hatfield, American singer-songwriter and musician  
  1967   – Hans Mathisen, Norwegian guitarist and composer
  1967   – Neil Smith, English cricketer
  1967   – Craig Wolanin, American ice hockey player
1968 – Maria Grazia Cucinotta, Italian actress and producer
  1968   – Tom Goodwin, American baseball player and coach
  1968   – Sabina Jeschke, Swedish-German engineer and academic
  1968   – Julian McMahon, Australian actor and producer
  1968   – Ricardo Rosset, Brazilian race car driver
1969 – Triple H, American wrestler and actor
  1969   – Jonty Rhodes, South African cricketer and coach
1970 – Nikolaj Coster-Waldau, Danish actor and producer
  1970   – David Davies, English-Welsh politician
1971 – Matthew Johns, Australian rugby league player, sportscaster and television host
  1971   – Anna Menconi, Italian Paralympic archer
1972 – Clint Robinson, Australian kayaker
  1972   – Maya Rudolph, American actress 
  1972   – Sheikh Muszaphar Shukor, Malaysian surgeon and astronaut
1973 – Cassandra Clare, American journalist and author
  1973   – Erik Nys, Belgian long jumper
  1973   – Gorden Tallis, Australian rugby league player and coach
1974 – Eason Chan, Hong Kong singer, actor, and producer
  1974   – Pete Yorn, American singer-songwriter and guitarist 
1975 – Serkan Çeliköz, Turkish keyboard player and songwriter 
  1975   – Shea Hillenbrand, American baseball player
  1975   – Fred Mascherino, American singer-songwriter and guitarist 
  1975   – Alessandro Pistone, Italian footballer
  1975   – Alex Rodriguez, American baseball player
1976 – Demis Hassabis, English computer scientist and academic
  1976   – Scott Mason, Australian cricketer (d. 2005)
1977 – Foo Swee Chin, Singaporean illustrator
  1977   – Björn Dreyer, German footballer
  1977   – Jonathan Rhys Meyers, Irish actor 
1978 – Diarmuid O'Sullivan, Irish hurler and manager
1979 – Marielle Franco, Brazilian politician, feminist, and human rights activist (d. 2018)
  1979   – Jorge Arce, Mexican boxer
  1979   – Sidney Govou, French footballer
  1979   – Shannon Moore, American wrestler and singer
1980 – Allan Davis, Australian cyclist
  1980   – Wesley Gonzales, Filipino basketball player
1981 – Susan King Borchardt, American basketball player
  1981   – Collins Obuya, Kenyan cricketer
  1981   – Dash Snow, American painter and photographer (d. 2009)
  1981   – Christopher Weselek, German rugby player
1982 – Neil Harbisson, English-Catalan painter, composer, and activist
1983 – Lorik Cana, Albanian footballer
  1983   – Martijn Maaskant, Dutch cyclist
  1983   – Goran Pandev, Macedonian footballer
  1983   – Soccor Velho, Indian footballer (d. 2013)
1984 – Antoine Bethea, American football player
  1984   – Tsuyoshi Nishioka, Japanese baseball player
  1984   – Max Scherzer, American baseball player
  1984   – Taylor Schilling, American actress
  1984   – Kenny Wormald, American actor, dancer, and choreographer
1985 – Husain Abdullah, American football player
  1985   – Matteo Pratichetti, Italian rugby player
  1985   – Ajmal Shahzad, English cricketer
1986 – DeMarre Carroll, American basketball player
  1986   – Ryan Flaherty, American baseball player
  1986   – Ryan Griffen, Australian footballer
1987 – Jacoby Ford, American football player
  1987   – Marek Hamšík, Slovak footballer
  1987   – Jordan Hill, American basketball player
  1987   – Sarah Parsons, American ice hockey player
1988 – Adam Biddle, Australian footballer
  1988   – Yoervis Medina, Venezuelan baseball player
  1988   – Ryan Tannehill, American football player
1989 – Maya Ali, Pakistani actress
1990 – Nick Hogan, American race car driver and actor
  1990   – Paolo Hurtado, Peruvian footballer
  1990   – Cheyenne Kimball, American singer-songwriter and guitarist 
  1990   – Stephen Li-Chung Kuo, Taiwanese-American figure skater
  1990   – Kriti Sanon, Indian actress
1991 – Wandy Peralta, Dominican baseball player
1993 – Reagan Campbell-Gillard, Australian rugby league player
  1993   – Max Power, English footballer
  1993   – Jordan Spieth, American golfer
  2003 – Elvina Kalieva, American tennis player

Deaths

Pre-1600
 903 – Abdallah II of Ifriqiya, Aghlabid emir
 959 – Chai Rong, emperor of Later Zhou
1144 – Salomea of Berg, High Duchess consort of Poland
1061 – Nicholas II, pope of the Catholic Church
1101 – Conrad II, king of Italy (b. 1074)
  1101   – Hugh d'Avranches, Earl of Chester (b. c. 1047)
1158 – Geoffrey VI, Count of Anjou (b. 1134)
1276 – James I of Aragon (b. 1208)
1365 – Rudolf IV, Duke of Austria (b. 1339)
1382 – Joanna I of Naples (b. 1326)
1469 – William Herbert, 1st Earl of Pembroke (b. 1423)

1601–1900
1656 – Salomo Glassius, German theologian and critic (b. 1593)
1675 – Henri de la Tour d'Auvergne, Vicomte de Turenne, French general (b. 1611)
1689 – John Graham, 1st Viscount Dundee, Scottish general (b. c. 1648)
1759 – Pierre Louis Maupertuis, French mathematician and philosopher (b. 1698)
1770 – Robert Dinwiddie, Scottish merchant and politician, Colonial Governor of Virginia (b. 1693)
1841 – Mikhail Lermontov, Russian poet and painter (b. 1814)
1844 – John Dalton, English physicist, meteorologist, and chemist (b. 1776)
1863 – William Lowndes Yancey, American journalist and politician (b. 1813)
1865 – Jean-Joseph Dassy, French painter and lithographer (b. 1791)
1875 – Aleksander Kunileid, Estonian composer and educator (b. 1845)
1876 – Albertus van Raalte, Dutch-born American minister and author (b. 1811)
1883 – Montgomery Blair, American lieutenant and politician, 20th United States Postmaster General (b. 1813)

1901–present
1916 – Charles Fryatt, English captain (b. 1872)
  1916   – William Jonas, English footballer (d. 1890)
1917 – Emil Theodor Kocher, Swiss physician and academic, Nobel Prize laureate (b. 1841)
1921 – Myrddin Fardd, Welsh writer and antiquarian scholar (b. 1836)
1924 – Ferruccio Busoni, Italian pianist, composer, and conductor (b. 1866)
1931 – Auguste Forel, Swiss neuroanatomist and psychiatrist (b. 1848)
1938 – Tom Crean, Irish seaman and explorer (b. 1877)
1941 – Alfred Henry O'Keeffe, New Zealand painter and educator (b. 1858)
1942 – Karl Pärsimägi, Estonian painter (b. 1902) 
1946 – Gertrude Stein, American novelist, poet, and playwright (b. 1874)
1948 – Woolf Barnato, English race car driver and businessman (b. 1898)
  1948   – Joe Tinker, American baseball player and manager (b. 1880)
1951 – Paul Kogerman, Estonian chemist and politician, 22nd Estonian Minister of Education (b. 1891)
1958 – Claire Lee Chennault, American general and pilot (b. 1893)
1960 – Julie Vinter Hansen, Danish-Swiss astronomer and academic (b. 1890)
1962 – Richard Aldington, English poet and author (b. 1892)
  1962   – James H. Kindelberger, American pilot and businessman (b. 1895)
1963 – Hooks Dauss, American baseball player (b. 1889)
  1963   – Garrett Morgan, American inventor (b. 1877)
1964 – Winifred Lenihan, American actress, writer, and director (b. 1898)
1965 – Daniel-Rops, French historian and author (b. 1901)
1968 – Babe Adams, American baseball player and manager (b. 1882)
1970 – António de Oliveira Salazar, Portuguese economist and politician, 100th Prime Minister of Portugal (b. 1889)
1971 – Charlie Tully, Irish footballer and manager (b. 1924)
1975 – Alfred Duraiappah, Sri Lankan Tamil lawyer and politician (d. 1926)
1978 – Bob Heffron, New Zealand-Australian miner and politician, 30th Premier of New South Wales (b. 1890)
  1978   – Willem van Otterloo, Dutch cellist, composer, and conductor (b. 1907)
1980 – Mohammad Reza Pahlavi, Iranian Shah (b. 1919)
1981 – William Wyler, American director, producer, and screenwriter (b. 1902)
  1981   – Elizabeth Rona, Hungarian American nuclear chemist (b. 1890)
1984 – James Mason, English actor (b. 1909)
1985 – Smoky Joe Wood, American baseball player and coach (b. 1889)
1987 – Travis Jackson, American baseball player, coach, and manager (b. 1903)
1988 – Frank Zamboni, American inventor and businessman, founded the Zamboni Company (b. 1901)
1990 – Bobby Day, American singer-songwriter, pianist, and producer (b. 1928)
  1990   – René Toribio, Guadeloupean politician (b. 1912)
1991 – John Friedrich, German-Australian engineer and conman (b. 1950)
1992 – Max Dupain, Australian photographer and educator (b. 1911)
  1992   – Tzeni Karezi, Greek actress and screenwriter 
1993 – Reggie Lewis, American basketball player (b. 1965)
1994 – Kevin Carter, South African photographer and journalist (b. 1960)
1995 – Melih Esenbel, Turkish politician and diplomat, 20th Turkish Minister of Foreign Affairs (b. 1915)
  1995   – Rick Ferrell, American baseball player and coach (b. 1905)
  1995   – Miklós Rózsa, Hungarian-American composer and conductor (b. 1907)
1998 – Binnie Barnes, English-American actress (b. 1903)
1999 – Aleksandr Danilovich Aleksandrov, Russian mathematician, physicist, and mountaineer (b. 1912)
  1999   – Harry Edison, American trumpet player (b. 1915)
2000 – Gordon Solie, American sportscaster (b. 1929)
2001 – Rhonda Sing, Canadian wrestler (b. 1961)
  2001   – Leon Wilkeson, American bass player and songwriter (b. 1952)
2003 – Vance Hartke, American lieutenant, lawyer, and politician (b. 1919)
  2003   – Bob Hope, English-American actor, comedian, television personality, and businessman (b. 1903)
2005 – Al Held, American painter and academic (b. 1928)
  2005   – Marten Toonder, Dutch author and illustrator (b. 1912)
2006 – Maryann Mahaffey, American academic and politician (b. 1925)
2007 – James Oyebola, Nigerian-English boxer (b. 1961)
2008 – Youssef Chahine, Egyptian director, producer, and screenwriter (b. 1926)
  2008   – Horst Stein, German-born Swiss conductor (b. 1928)
  2008   – Isaac Saba Raffoul, Mexican businessman (b. 1923)
2010 – Maury Chaykin, American-Canadian actor (b. 1949)
  2010   – Jack Tatum, American football player (b. 1948)
2012 – Norman Alden, American actor (b. 1924)
  2012   – R. G. Armstrong, American actor and playwright (b. 1917)
  2012   – Darryl Cotton, Australian singer-songwriter, guitarist, and actor (b. 1949)
  2012   – Geoffrey Hughes, English actor (b. 1944)
  2012   – Tony Martin, American actor and singer (b. 1913)
  2012   – Jack Taylor, English footballer and referee (b. 1930)
2013 – Fernando Alonso, Cuban dancer, co-founded the Cuban National Ballet (b. 1914)
  2013   – Lindy Boggs, American politician and diplomat, 5th United States Ambassador to the Holy See (b. 1916)
  2013   – Bud Day, American colonel and pilot, Medal of Honor recipient (b. 1925)
  2013   – Kidd Kraddick, American radio host (b. 1959)
  2013   – Ilya Segalovich, Russian businessman, co-founded Yandex (b. 1964)
2014 – Richard Bolt, New Zealand air marshal and pilot (b. 1923)
  2014   – George Freese, American baseball player and coach (b. 1926)
  2014   – Wallace Jones, American basketball player and coach (b. 1926)
  2014   – Francesco Marchisano, Italian cardinal (b. 1929)
  2014   – Paul Schell, American lawyer and politician, 50th Mayor of Seattle (b. 1937)
2015 – Rickey Grundy, American singer-songwriter (b. 1959)
  2015   – A. P. J. Abdul Kalam, Indian engineer, academic, and politician, 11th President of India (b. 1931)
  2015   – Samuel Pisar, Polish-born American lawyer and author (b. 1929)
  2015   – Anthony Shaw, English general (b. 1930)
2016 – Einojuhani Rautavaara, Finnish composer (b.1928)
  2016   – James Alan McPherson, American short story writer and essayist (b. 1943)
  2016   – Jerry Doyle, American actor and talk show host (b. 1956)
  2016   – Piet de Jong, Dutch politician and naval officer, Minister of Defence), Prime Minister of the Netherlands (b. 1915)
2017 – Sam Shepard, American playwright, actor, author, screenwriter, and director (b.1943)
2018 – Marco Aurelio Denegri, Peruvian literature critic, television host and sexologist
2022 – Tony Dow, American actor, film producer, director, and sculptor (b. 1945)

Holidays and observances
Christian feast day:
Arethas (Western Christianity)
Aurelius and Natalia and companions of the Martyrs of Córdoba.
Maurus, Pantalemon, and Sergius
Pantaleon
Seven Sleepers of Ephesus (Roman Martyrology)
National Sleepy Head Day (Finland)
Theobald of Marly
Titus Brandsma, O.Carm.
July 27 (Eastern Orthodox liturgics)
Day of Victory in the Great Fatherland Liberation War (North Korea)
Iglesia ni Cristo Day (the Philippines)
José Celso Barbosa Day (Puerto Rico)
Martyrs and Wounded Soldiers Day (Vietnam)

References

External links

 
 
 

Days of the year
July